Frederick or Fred Hall may refer to:

 Frederick Hall (actor) (1923–1995), British actor

 Frederick Hall (painter) (1860–1948), English impressionist painter
 Frederick Hall (Normanton MP) (1855–1933), British Labour Member of Parliament 1905–1933
 Sir Frederick Hall, 1st Baronet (1864–1932), British Conservative Member of Parliament for Dulwich 1910–1932
 Frederick William Hall (1885–1915), Canadian recipient of the Victoria Cross
 Frederick William Hall (academic) (1868–1933), President of St John's College, Oxford

 Frederick Wilson Hall (1908–1984), New Jersey Supreme Court judge
 Frederic Aldin Hall (1854–1925), chancellor of Washington University in St. Louis
 Fred Hall (1916–1970), governor of Kansas 1955–1957
 Fred Hall (footballer, born 1917) (1917–1989), English footballer for Sunderland
 Fred Hall (footballer, born 1924) (1924–2006), English footballer for Birmingham City, later president of Huntingdonshire County FA
 Fred Hall (musician) (1898–1954), American pianist and bandleader
 Freddy Hall (1985–2022), Bermudian footballer